Nicole Cohen is an American installation artist, who works with video and new media in order to explore issues of how interior design and architecture reveals aspects of portraiture and identity. Cohen's video works often include
interiors from vintage magazines, period rooms, that reveal an intervention with technology of surveillance use or video projection overlay. She uses photography and creates a video animation on top of the past image.

She uses video to transform and alter interior designed and architectural spaces. She explores ideas of perception and surveillance through her projects. Her influences stem from film/cinematic theory and the physical experience of immersion.

Her work is positioned at the crossroads of contemporary reality, personal fantasy, and culturally constructed space. Although, trained in painting and drawing, Cohen most frequently uses video as her medium, playing upon intrinsic capacities to manipulate time, distort scale and environment, and overlay imagery. Consistently interested in engaging her audience and challenging the notions of lifestyle, domesticity, celebrity, and social behavior, Cohen also uses the surveillance camera to involve viewers in their own voyeurism. – Getty Museum, “Please Be Seated”, Solo Commissioned Video Installation, 2007–09, from brochure publication, written by Peggy Fogelman.

Life and career  
Born in Falmouth, Massachusetts in 1970, Nicole Cohen received a Bachelor of Arts degree from Hampshire College in Amherst, Massachusetts and a Master of Fine Arts degree from the University of Southern California. She has exhibited at the Williams College Museum of Art (Williamstown, MA), the Fabric Workshop and Museum (Philadelphia, PA), the Los Angeles County Museum of Art, and the New York Public Library. She has also shown internationally in Berlin, Germany; Bergen, Norway; Paris, France; Harajaku, Osaka, Kobe, and Tokyo, Japan; and Shanghai,China.

Cohen’s work is positioned at the intersection of contemporary reality, personal fantasy, and culturally constructed space. She consistently explores her interest in engaging the audience and challenging notions of lifestyle, domesticity, celebrity, and social behavior. Although trained in painting and drawing, Cohen most frequently uses video as her medium, playing upon its intrinsic capacities to manipulate time, distort scale and environment, and overlay imagery.

Cohen grew up in Washington, D.C. and Woods Hole, Cape Cod. She lived in Berlin, Germany for four years and currently lives in NYC.

Collective 
Nicole Cohen is the Founder/ Director of the Berlin Collective.  Berlin Collective was founded in 2009, and is an artist platform for international exchange to support the arts and American culture. Cohen focused on creating an artist/ curator run collective based in NYC and mostly Berlin with the aim to provide opportunities, knowledge and intellectual growth to art professionals by strengthening international discourse. .

Museum exhibitions 
 Brooklyn Museum, Brooklyn, New York (2012)
 Katzen Arts Center, American University Museum, Washington, D.C. (2011)
 The J. Paul Getty Museum, Los Angeles, CA, (2007–09)
 Williams College Museum of Art, Williamstown, MA, (2003)
 Los Angeles County Museum of Art, Los Angeles, CA, (2001), Autostadt, Wolfsburg, Germany, Schloss Britz, Berlin, Germany
 Please Be Seated, Solo Exhibition at the Getty Museum, (2007)

Galleries
Morgan Lehman Gallery, NYC 
Shoshana Wayne Gallery, LA 
La B.A.N.K.Galerie, Paris

Selected video works 
 Grand Maison, video, 2009 still from video
 Please Be Seated, Video Installation, 2007-2009 video
 How to Make Your Windows Beautiful, Video Installation, 2005 video
 Sunday Morning, video, 2003 still from video
 40-Love, Video Installation, 2003 video
 Van Fantasies, video, 2001 video

References

External links 
 Nicole Cohen – Official website
 Morgan Lehman Gallery: Nicole Cohen
 Shoshana Wayne Gallery: Nicole Cohen
 Berlin Collective
 Artsy - Nicole Cohen 

Living people
1970 births